Anolis strahmi, the Baoruco stout anole or Strahm's anole, is a species of lizard in the family Dactyloidae. The species is found in the Dominican Republic.

References

Anoles
Reptiles described in 1979
Endemic fauna of the Dominican Republic
Reptiles of the Dominican Republic
Taxa named by Albert Schwartz (zoologist)